Tove Lifvendahl (born 14 February 1974 in Seoul, South Korea) is Swedish writer, speaker and political commentator affiliated with the Moderate Party.

Early life and education
Lifvendahl is an adoptee from South Korea. She grew up in Hälsingland and graduated from Uppsala University.

Career
In 2000, Lifvendahl was elected national chair of the Moderate Youth League, the youth-wing of the Moderate Party.

She was very successful in attracting media attention to the Moderate Youth League, but also led the failed campaign in 2002 which saw the Moderate share of first-time voters decrease from 30% to 13%. On the day of the election she called for older politicians to resign and make room for younger, more modern Moderates. This contributed to, among others, Per Unckel leaving front-line politics.

After Lifvendahl's resignation from MUF in 2002 she became the first Moderate Youth League chairman to be re-elected to the board of the party on her own mandate, a position she left in 2005. During the party congress of 2005 she opposed proposals for a more lenient view of trade unions.

Lifvendahl has contributed to many publications, among them her own book on former Moderate leader Gösta Bohman.

In 2013, she became Political Editor-in-chief of Svenska Dagbladet, a position she has held since.

Other activities
 Trilateral Commission, Member of the European Group

References

External links

Moderate Party politicians
1974 births
Living people